Brian McDonald or MacDonald may refer to:

 Brian McDonald (Australian footballer) (born 1927), Australian rules footballer
 Brian Macdonald (choreographer) (1928–2014), Canadian dancer, choreographer and director
 Brian McDonald (Gaelic footballer) (born 1980)
 Brian McDonald (ice hockey) (born 1945), former ice hockey centre
 Brian Macdonald (politician), Canadian politician
 Brian MacDonald (sailor) (born 1943), Canadian Paralympic sailor
 Brian McDonald (screenwriter) (born 1965), American screenwriter
 Brian MacDonald, of the singing duo The MacDonald Brothers